Aminabad (also Romanized as Āmīnābād) is a village in Bibi Sakineh Rural District, in the Central District of Malard County, Tehran Province, Iran. At the 2006 census, its population was 210, in 48 families.

References 

Populated places in Malard County